Bruce Covernton (born August 12, 1966) is a former professional Canadian Football League player. He was selected first overall by the Calgary Stampeders in the 1992 Canadian College Draft.

Covernton was first team All-American and All-Big Sky Conference at Weber State University. Bruce also attend the NFL Combine in 1991.

Covernton was voted the West's top rookie in 1992 and top offensive lineman in 1993. He twice earned division All-Star honours and was All-CFL in 1993. Covernton was part of the Grey Cup championship teams in 1992 and 1998.

Covernton is owner and CEO of a staffing company in Calgary and involved in many local charities.

References

1966 births
Living people
Calgary Stampeders players
Canadian Football League Rookie of the Year Award winners
Canadian football offensive linemen
Canadian players of American football
Manitoba Bisons football players
Weber State Wildcats football players
People from Morris, Manitoba
Players of Canadian football from Manitoba